Killeshin GAA is a Gaelic Athletic Association football club in the village of Killeshin, County Laois, Ireland.

The club colours are green and white and the club grounds, which are near the Laois/Carlow border, are called Seamus Hearns Park/Pairc Uisean. In 2019, Killeshin reached their first-ever Senior County Final. 

Killeshin have never won the Laois Senior Football Championship title but they have won the Laois Intermediate Football Championship four times (1958, 1974, 1993 and 2011) and the Laois Junior Football Championship four times  (1957, 1969, 1981 and 2008).

The club won season four of RTÉ's Celebrity Bainisteoir in 2011, with ex-Ireland soccer star Tony Cascarino as their manager.

Achievements
 Laois Intermediate Football Championship: (4) 1958, 1974, 1993, 2011
 Laois Junior Football Championships (4) 1957, 1969, 1981, 2008
 Laois All-County Football League Division 2: (2) 1986, 2013
 Laois All-County Football League Division 3: (5) 1979, 1980, 1981, 2006, 2011
 Laois All-County Football League Division 4: (2) 2013, 2015
 Laois All-County Football League Division 5: (1) 2011

Notable players
 Stephen Attride
 Eoin Lowry
 Liam Doran Snr

References

Gaelic games clubs in County Laois
Gaelic football clubs in County Laois